Iryna Honcharova (born December 19, 1974) is a Ukrainian team handball goalkeeper. She received a bronze medal with the Ukrainian national team at the 2004 Summer Olympics in Athens.

References

External links

1974 births
Living people 
Ukrainian female handball players
Handball players at the 2004 Summer Olympics
Olympic bronze medalists for Ukraine
Olympic medalists in handball 
Medalists at the 2004 Summer Olympics
Ukrainian expatriate sportspeople in Kazakhstan
21st-century Ukrainian women